T. S. Murugesan Pillai (1870-1930) was a Telugu writer, poet and translator who is known for translating Tamil classical works into Telugu.

Personal life 

Murugesan Pillai was born in Tiruchirappalli in 1870 but spent most of his life in Ettaiyapuram estate. He was a close friend of Subbarama Dikshitar.

Works 

In 1904, Murugesan Pillai made his mark by praising  Subbarama Dikshitar's Sangitha Sampradaya Pradharshini and Venkateswara Ettappa, the then zamindar of Ettaiyapuram estate. In 1918, he wrote a Telugu biography of the Tamil poet Kambar titled Kambamahakavi Jeevitamu. In 1923, Murugesan Pillai published Nupuramahima, a Telugu prosaic translation of the Tamil epic Silappadhikaram.

In 1918, Murugesan Pillai published Dravidandhra Bhashala Anyonyasambandhamu a comparative grammar of Tamil and Telugu languages.

References 

 

1870 births
1930 deaths
Writers from Tiruchirappalli
Poets from Tamil Nadu
Telugu-language writers
20th-century Indian translators